Péter Pálos (born 31 August 1985) is a Hungarian para table tennis player. He is one of Hungary's top performing Paralympic table tennis players as a former World Number One in his sports class 11 on three occasions: April to September 2013, April to September 2014 and August to October 2015.

References

1985 births
Table tennis players from Budapest
Hungarian male table tennis players
Paralympic table tennis players of Hungary
Medalists at the 2004 Summer Paralympics
Medalists at the 2012 Summer Paralympics
Medalists at the 2016 Summer Paralympics
Table tennis players at the 2004 Summer Paralympics
Table tennis players at the 2012 Summer Paralympics
Table tennis players at the 2016 Summer Paralympics
Living people
Paralympic medalists in table tennis
Paralympic gold medalists for Hungary
Paralympic bronze medalists for Hungary
Table tennis players at the 2020 Summer Paralympics
21st-century Hungarian people